NEBL'2000 was the first complete season of the North European Basketball League. The tournament was held during the 1999-2000 basketball season on 5 January – 16 April 2000.

After holding Promotion Cup, teams from four more countries – Germany, Russia, Ukraine and Denmark – took part in NEBL'2000.

League accepted the participation of Magic M7 from Sweden, with which Earvin "Magic" Johnson entered into an agreement.

CSKA won the tournament by defeating Lietuvos rytas in the final.

Andrius Giedraitis from Lietuvos rytas was named as the Most valuable player.

Clubs

Regular season

Results 

Source: Worldbasket.com

Play-offs

Eight-finals

|}

Quarterfinals

|}

Final four

Semifinal 1

Semifinal 2

Third-place game

Final

Final standings

References

External links
 Teams
 Scores&Standings
 Schedule

2000
1999–2000 in European basketball leagues
1999–2000 in Lithuanian basketball
1999–2000 in Latvian basketball
1999–2000 in Swedish basketball
1999–2000 in Estonian basketball
1999–2000 in Finnish basketball
1999–2000 in Danish basketball
1999–2000 in German basketball
1999–2000 in Russian basketball
1999–2000 in Ukrainian basketball